A motion or application for leave is a motion filed with the court seeking permission to deviate from an established rule or procedure of the court.

The most common use of a motion for leave is to seek an extension to an already-passed time frame to amend a court pleading, which is allowed once under the Federal Rules of Criminal Procedure, to make changes of error made in title or body.

References

Civil procedure legal terminology
American legal terminology